Rook is a surname. Notable people with the surname include:

Ada Rook, Canadian musician
Alan Rook (1909-1990), editor of the 1936 issue of New Oxford Poetry, one of the Cairo poets
Jean Rook (1931–1991), British newspaper columnist
Jerry Rook (1943-2019), American former professional basketball player
Susan Rook, journalist and photographer

Fictional people 

 Bodhi Rook, Star Wars character

See also
Albert Harold Rooks (1891–1942), Captain in U.S. Navy, World War II Medal of Honor recipient